Before entering politics and ultimately becoming the 45th president of the United States, Donald Trump pursued a career as a celebrity. He released several ghostwritten books, most prominently The Art of the Deal (1987). Starting in the 1990s, he was a regular guest on the Howard Stern Show and other talk shows, joined the professional wrestling company World Wrestling Federation/Entertainment, and made several cameo film and TV appearances. From 2004 to 2015, Trump hosted The Apprentice, a reality show on NBC in which contestants competed on business-related tasks.

Books 

Trump's first ghostwritten book, The Art of the Deal (1987), was on the New York Times Best Seller list for 48 weeks. According to The New Yorker, "The book expanded Trump's renown far beyond New York City, promoting an image of himself as a successful dealmaker and tycoon." Tony Schwartz, who is credited as co-author, later said he did all the writing, backed by Howard Kaminsky, then-head of Random House, the book's publisher. Two further lesser memoirs were published in 1990 and 1997.

After leaving office in 2021, Trump became the first former U.S. president in recent times to not quickly secure a book deal, which several members of his administration managed to do. Trump said that he had received and rejected two offers. But Politico reported that none of the "big five" publishers had approached Trump, and that they were reluctant to do so because of his reputation for untruthfulness.

Professional wrestling 

Trump has had a sporadic relationship with professional wrestling promotion World Wrestling Federation/Entertainment and its owners Vince and Linda McMahon since the late 1980s; in 1988 and 1989, WrestleMania IV and V, which took place at the Atlantic City Convention Hall, were billed in storyline as taking place at the nearby Trump Plaza. In 2004, Trump appeared for a live interview at WrestleMania XX, conducted by Jesse Ventura, a former wrestler and former Governor of Minnesota.

In 2007, Trump participated in the "Battle of the Billionaires" storyline feud against Vince McMahon. Trump then headlined WrestleMania 23 that year. In 2009, Trump participated in a storyline in which he bought WWE Raw from Vince McMahon, then re-sold it back shortly after.

Trump was inducted into the celebrity wing of the WWE Hall of Fame in 2013. As president, Trump in 2016 appointed Linda McMahon to his Cabinet as Administrator of the Small Business Administration.

Television

Talk shows 

Starting in the 1990s, Trump was a guest about 24 times on the nationally syndicated Howard Stern Show. He also had his own short-form talk radio program called Trumped! (one to two minutes on weekdays) from 2004 to 2008. In 2011, he was given a weekly unpaid guest commentator spot on Fox & Friends that continued until he started his presidential candidacy in 2015.

The Apprentice 

In 2003, Trump became the co-producer and host of The Apprentice, a reality show in which contestants competed for a one-year management job with the Trump Organization, and Trump weeded out applicants with the catchphrase "You're fired". He later co-hosted The Celebrity Apprentice, in which celebrities competed to win money for charities.

Acting 

Trump has made cameo appearances in eight films and television shows and performed a song as a Green Acres character with Megan Mullally at the 57th Primetime Emmy Awards in 2005. Actor Matt Damon claims that his extensive list of cameos is due to a demand that he be allowed to cameo in any movie that features one of his properties, and that these scenes are usually cut in post-production.

On January 19, 2021, the national board of  the actor's union SAG-AFTRA voted to convene a disciplinary process to discuss Trump's expulsion from for his part in the 2021 storming of the United States Capitol and a "reckless campaign of misinformation" that endangered other SAG-AFTRA members. On February 4, Trump resigned before the disciplinary process was scheduled to convene.

See also
Business career of Donald Trump
Political career of Donald Trump
Donald Trump in popular culture

References

Donald Trump
Early lives of the presidents of the United States